Park Kyung-Ae (born 25 August 1971) is a female former international table tennis player from South Korea.

Table tennis career
She won a silver medal for South Korea at the 1995 World Table Tennis Championships in the Corbillon Cup (women's team event) with Kim Moo-kyo, Park Hae-jung and Ryu Ji-hae.

She represented South Korea at the Olympic Games in 1996.

See also
 List of World Table Tennis Championships medalists

References

1971 births
Living people
South Korean female table tennis players
World Table Tennis Championships medalists
Olympic table tennis players of South Korea
Table tennis players at the 1996 Summer Olympics
20th-century South Korean women